Vratislav Greško (born 24 July 1977) is a Slovak former footballer. His preferred position was left-back. He was an attacking full-back widely known for his crossing ability.

Club career

Early career
Greško began his career at Dukla Banská Bystrica in 1995, before he was signed by Inter Bratislava in 1997 where he played until 1999.

Bayer Leverkusen
He moved to Bayer Leverkusen in 1999.

Move to Internazionale and Parma 
In October 2000, he signed a four–year contract with Internazionale for a fee of €4.857 million (exactly 9.5 million Deutsche Mark), which media reported a difference figure from 9 billion lire (€4.65 million) to 14 billion lire (€7.23 million) Greško was the first Slovak who ever played for Inter. He made his league debut on 1 November 2000 in a 2–0 victory against Roma. On 5 May 2002, during the last week of the 2001–02 season, Greško headed the ball to Karel Poborský, allowing him to score in a 2–4 defeat against Lazio. After the match, he was heavily criticised for the error, which led to Inter losing the scudetto. His performance at Inter Milan was "firm" and "erratic". He spent only eighteen months between November 2000 and June 2002, making a total of 41 league appearances.

A swap deal was also made between Internazionale and Parma in June 2002, which saw Greško make a switch for Matías Almeyda, both players were tagged for €16 million The deal was criticized as a financial success than a good deal for the team performance.  He was out of favour at his next club, Parma, he made just two full appearances during the 2002–03 season.

Blackburn Rovers
Meanwhile, Blackburn Rovers manager Graeme Souness was looking for left-sided defensive cover. Greško, who initially played on loan to Blackburn for four months (January–May 2003) was given a full contract in August. He scored twice in his first permanent season at Blackburn, with goals against Tottenham Hotspur and Bolton Wanderers.

During the 2004–05 campaign, he suffered a cruciate ligament damage in December which led to him not playing for the rest of the season. He then did not make a single appearance during the 2005–06 season, and was released when his contract expired in July. Not only this season was over for him, even during the following season, he struggled with form and persistent symptoms.

Move to Nürnberg and return to Bayer Leverkusen
In 2006, he moved to 1. FC Nürnberg, joining his Slovakian teammates Róbert Vittek and Marek Mintál. In September 2006, Greško signed there in the light of his injury a strong performance-based one-year contract. In October 2006, he made his Bundesliga debut as a substitute. Overall in the 2006–07 season, he started in 15 matches in the Bundesliga, scoring one goal.

In July 2007, Greško returned to Bayer Leverkusen as a free agent on a two-year contract after nearly seven years.  In June 2009, Bayer Leverkusen announced that Greško would leave the club.

ŽP ŠPORT Podbrezová
In March 2011, he joined Slovak club ŽP ŠPORT Podbrezová (promoted to the second league 2011–12 – the second highest team event in Slovakia), Where he received a one-year contract in July 2011. On 14 June 2015, he announced end of professional career.

International career
Greško appeared 34 times for the Slovak national team, scoring two goals. He scored his first goal in the A-team on 14 May 2002 in the friendly against Uzbekistan.

International goals
Scores and results list Slovakia's goal tally first.

Honours
1. FC Nürnberg
 DFB-Pokal 2006–07

References

External links
 Inter Archive
 Leverkusen who's who
 
 
 

1977 births
Living people
People from Banská Bystrica District
Sportspeople from the Banská Bystrica Region
Slovak footballers
Slovak expatriate footballers
Slovakia international footballers
Slovakia under-21 international footballers
FK Inter Bratislava players
FK Dukla Banská Bystrica players
FK Železiarne Podbrezová players
Bayer 04 Leverkusen players
Inter Milan players
Parma Calcio 1913 players
Blackburn Rovers F.C. players
Expatriate footballers in Germany
Expatriate footballers in Italy
Slovak expatriate sportspeople in Germany
Expatriate footballers in England
Slovak expatriate sportspeople in England
Association football defenders
Premier League players
1. FC Nürnberg players
Slovak Super Liga players
Bundesliga players
Serie A players
Footballers at the 2000 Summer Olympics
Olympic footballers of Slovakia